Gostun may refer to:

 Gostun, a Ukrainian ruler
 Gostun, Bulgaria in Blagoevgrad Province, Bulgaria
 Gostun, Serbia in Serbia
 Gostuń in Poland